Julian Talbot Bailey (March 22, 1859 - ?) was a teacher, college president, journalist, newspaper editor, publisher, and lawyer in Arkansas. He advocated for the rights of African Americans.

Bailey was born in Warren County, Georgia. He graduated from Howard University and became a teacher. He served as president of Bethel University from 1886 to 1887.

In 1891 he was admitted to the bar and established The Sun newspaper in Little Rock.

He was quoted as saying, "Since the negro and the southern white man were reared together, by voting alike I thought the objectionable race prejudice would readily come to a close. We are all here and what is one's interest is the others."

An engraving was made of him that is held in the collection of the New York Public Library.

References

External links
"Julian Talbot: Lawyer and strong proponent of civil rights for African Americans"

1859 births
People from Warren County, Georgia
African-American educators
19th-century American educators
Heads of universities and colleges in the United States
American male journalists
Editors of Arkansas newspapers
African-American journalists
19th-century American newspaper editors
Journalists from Arkansas
African-American lawyers
19th-century American lawyers
Lawyers from Little Rock, Arkansas
Educators from Arkansas
19th-century American newspaper founders
Year of death missing